During World War II, Morocco, which was then occupied by France, was controlled by Vichy France from 1940 to 1942 after the occupation of France by Nazi Germany. However, after the North African campaign (June 1940 – May 1943), Morocco was under Allied control and thus was active in Allied operations until the end of the war.

Background 
In 1940, after France became subject to German occupation, France was divided into two regions. One was occupied by German forces and the other was under French control, with its capital in Vichy. The latter became the Vichy regime, which controlled Southern Morocco. Post the 1942 landings, the Vichy administration remained but Southern Morocco was effectively under Allied control. This Allied control saw many indigenous Moroccan soldiers fight on Allied behalf as part of French forces. In Vichy controlled southern Morocco, the Moroccan Jewish population faced significant restrictions, due to the introduction of Vichy race laws.  This Allied control also made southern Morocco the location for the Casablanca Conference, where Winston Churchill and Franklin D. Roosevelt met to discuss wartime operations.  On the southern Morocco home front, daily life changed little, but the nationalist movement attempted to gain momentum, despite facing opposition from French forces. Northern Morocco was controlled by Spain through a  "puppet" government headed by a viceroy and it participated largely in the Spanish Civil War, rather than World War II.

Life during World War II 
Slavery existed in Morocco before and during the establishment of the French protectorate, with many wealthy Moroccans owning slaves, including the Moroccan royal family. Shanty towns arose near Moroccan cities in the 1930s which continued to grow during the war. European refugees fleeing to Morocco experienced poverty on their arrival, with many of them in Casablanca sleeping in converted dance halls with poor conditions. In terms of education, separate educational institutions were set up to teach the Muslim and the French population. Access to the baccalaureate was provided to the Moroccan Muslim population in 1930, but access to elite French schools (lycees) was not provided to the Muslim population until after the end of the war. Around ninety percent of the Muslim population of Morocco was illiterate during World War II.

Jewish discrimination 
Before World War II, Jews in Morocco were in poverty. They lived in Jewish quarters named ,  and had little social status with Resident General Charles Nogues not allowing Jews who enlisted in 1939 and 1940 to fight, but only to work on the industrial side of the war effort. In 1940, laws were put in place by the Vichy administration which disallowed the majority of Jews from working as doctors, lawyers or teachers. Vichy anti-semitic propaganda was distributed throughout Morocco to encourage the boycotting of Jews. Pamphlets were pinned on the frontages of Jewish shops. Around 7,700 Jews, while attempting to flee Morocco in favour of America or Israel, were moved to detention centres, with some refugees considered a threat to the Vichy regime being sent to Moroccan labour camps. The American landings in 1942 created hope that the Vichy laws would discontinue, but General Nogues persuaded the Allies to allow for the continuation of French rule and Vichy laws.

Moroccan nationalist movements 
Moroccan anti-occupation nationalist movements gained momentum in Morocco during World War II against the French and Spanish occupation of Morocco. Nationalists in Spanish Morocco created the 'National Reform Party' and the 'Moroccan Unity Movement', which united during the war and were common vehicles for Fascist propaganda. The 1942 landings were encouraged by the nationalists in French Morocco, who hoped the Allies would assist in the fight for Moroccan independence. After Moroccan Nationalists in French Morocco were found to have received letters from Ibrahim al-Wazzani, a nationalist in Spanish Morocco who was involved in aiding the Axis powers, the Allies rejected independence and upheld the Vichy laws. On 11 January 1944, a group of Moroccan Nationalists, in French Morocco, created a declaration of Moroccan Independence which they proceeded to display to the French Resident General. By 18 January 1944, the Moroccan Sultan and other influential figures had demonstrated their approval for the nationalists. French authorities arrested influential nationalists linked to this document and took many to prison camps. However, for many Moroccans, this only worked to increase support for the movement. The British secretly funded many Moroccan nationalist activities in Southern and Northern Morocco, in an attempt to prevent German control of the country.

Moroccan Goumiers 

The Goumiers were the indigenous Moroccan soldiers who fought during World War II initially fighting on behalf of Vichy France and the Axis powers. Fifty-three percent of the soldiers provided to France by its colonial empire in September 1939 came from Morocco and areas of North Africa. After the Allied landing in Casablanca in 1942 (Operation Torch), the French administration in Morocco began to support the Allied powers. The Goumiers began to be utilised by the Allies, mostly in mountain areas due to their effective mountaineering abilities.

The Goumiers fought against German forces in Tunisia, successfully removing the Germans in the area and taking over ten thousand prisoners of war. The Goumiers also participated in the Sicilian campaign (Operation Husky) and the liberation of Corsica. The German withdrawal from Corsica allowed Allied control of its airfields, for use in subsequent campaigns against France and Italy. The Goumiers also successfully conquered the island of Elba, which was being used as a base for German aircraft and E-boats. They also partook in Operation Diadem, where they aided in successfully infiltrating the Axis Gustav line which stretched across the Italian mountains. Moreover, their fighting across the Aurunci mountains aided in allowing the Allied troops to break the Hitler Line. The taking of Route 6 by the Goumiers allowed the Allies to enter and liberate Rome. In July, the Goumiers went on to liberate Sienna from German control. Ten thousand Goumiers successfully liberated Marseilles from German control, driving the German troops to Vieux-Port, with General Schaeffer ordering his German troops to surrender the city in August 1944.

After pushing the German troops back at Monte Cassino in Italy, the Moroccan forces of the French army were granted fifty hours of total freedom from punishment for crime. The monument Mamma Ciociara, in Sacco of the Campania region, was designed to pay tribute to the women who were abused and lost their lives during this event.

Propaganda 
The Germans, the British, and the French all employed propaganda in Morocco in World War II. From 1939, using Radio Berlin and Radio Stuttgart, Nazi Germany broadcast propaganda throughout Morocco. This propaganda significantly promoted the German-Muslim relationship, whilst being largely anti-semitic. From 1943, the Moroccan Bureau du Maghreb Arab', created the journal '' to disseminate Nazi Propaganda. The BBC then began broadcasting news of the war to Morocco in 1939, presenting a pro-Britain outlook. Broadcasts from Radio London attempted to present Britain as benevolent to establish the support of Morocco's population. In 1942, Moroccan dialects were introduced to the British broadcasts, in an attempt to successfully reach more people. Propaganda was also used by the French in Morocco towards the indigenous Moroccan soldiers. Newspapers such as the Annasr attempted to establish a feeling of nationalism in the Goumiers. Many images were used in this propaganda to allow this propaganda to be accessible to illiterate soldiers.

Military events

Operation Torch 

Around 90,000 Allied forces, sailing from ports in Virginia and in Britain, amphibiously landed at Algeria and Morocco on 8 November 1942. The invasion took place through Casablanca and was meant to force the Vichy territories of North Africa into Allied control while allowing movement through the African coast.  

The Moroccan Sultan Sidi Mohammed Ben Youssef welcomed the Allied forces.  Around 60,000 French troops resisted the Allied invasion while many deserted to join the Allied forces. Despite Vichy resistance, the Allied forces had taken control of Fedala, Safi, and Casablanca by 11 November 1942 and a ceasefire was negotiated on the same day. Following this, Vichy French forces fought for the Allied powers, per an agreement enforced on November 13, 1942. This switch in alliance caused Hitler to occupy the entirety of France and to send Axis forces to fight the Allies in the Mediterranean theatre.

Medical units were significantly lacking when the Western Task Force of the Allied troops landed in Morocco on 8 November 1942. Only twenty ambulances were fit for use and surgical operations taking place that night had only three torches for lighting. A single fridge (which was purchased off a Moroccan merchant) was obtainable for refrigeration of supplies. As there was a lack of transportation, it took an extended period before the supplies coming off the ships could reach medical units. Therefore Allied forces in their campaigns in Italy supplied the goumiers and French army with medical officers who carried medical bags containing basic medical supplies, so care could still be applied in the event of delay of supplies. The Allies also provided what was known as "evacuation hospitals", which contained Allied medical staff who landed in Morocco with forces during Operation Torch. These hospitals would follow the French colonial army on campaigns in Morocco and in the Italian region. The hospitals would set up 18 miles behind the front-line and provide medical care for wounded soldiers.

Casablanca Conference 

In January 1943, Winston Churchill and Franklin D. Roosevelt, accompanied by their advisors, met secretly in a hotel in Casablanca to discuss current issues and to decide Allied war strategies. A policy of unconditional surrender was adopted at this conference. According to Roosevelt, this was to ensure 

 

Roosevelt also met with Sultan Mohammad V of Morocco at the Casablanca Conference and urged him to work towards independence for Morocco from Spanish and French forces.

Sultan Mohammad V 
Sidi Mohammed Ben Youssef of Morocco, or Mohammad V, was the Sultan of Morocco during the World War II period. He was chosen by the French Residency to be the Sultan because it was believed that he would be the easiest of his siblings for French officials to successfully control. 

As Morocco was under Vichy control, Mohammad V had little power in the prevention of Vichy discrimination laws, but he expressed his moral objection to them in his dealings with French officials. Mohammad V did protect the Jewish population in some ways, preventing the use of the Star of David as an identifier of Jewish subjects from use in Morocco. Mohammad V also insisted Vichy laws apply only to those who identified religiously as Jewish, rather than on birthright as was standard in Nazi policy.  Mohammad V also invited Jewish subjects to a banquet he hosted in 1941 without French approval.

Following the landings of the Allies in Morocco, President Roosevelt wrote to Mohammad V and expressed that the Allies were to be benevolent subjugators in Morocco. In his letter, he wrote:

Mohammad V replied:

Aftermath 
The United States and other former Allies continued to be involved in Morocco for several years after World War II, which saw its resources used during the Cold War. In 1951, there were five American air bases in use in Morocco. In 1953, Mohammad V was exiled to Corsica for refusing to approve the enforcement of several French laws He was sent to Corsica and then Madagascar. Two years later, he was allowed to return due to violence that occurred during his absence.

On 2 March 1956, a Franco-Moroccan agreement overrode the Treaty of Fez that established the French protectorate.
 Therefore, Morocco became independent on 7 April 1956 when France relinquished control of the area.

References 

 
1940s in Morocco
World War II national military histories
Politics of World War II